Eureka (Wiyot: Jaroujiji, Hupa: do'-wi-lotl-ding, Karuk: uuth) is the principal city and county seat of Humboldt County in the Redwood Empire region of California. At the 2010 census, the population of the city was 27,191, and the population of Greater Eureka was 45,034.

Eureka is the largest coastal city between San Francisco and Portland, Oregon, and the westernmost city of more than 25,000 residents in the 48 contiguous states. The proximity to the sea causes the city to have an extremely maritime climate with very small annual temperature differences and seasons mainly being defined by the rainy winters and dry summers, whereas nearby inland areas are much hotter in summer. It is the regional center for government, health care, trade, and the arts on the North Coast north of the San Francisco Bay Area.

The headquarters of both the Six Rivers National Forest and the North Coast Redwoods District of the California State Parks System are in Eureka. As entrepôt for hundreds of lumber mills that once existed in the area, the city played a leading role in the historic West Coast lumber trade. The entire city is a state historic landmark, which has hundreds of significant Victorian homes, including the nationally recognized Carson Mansion, and the city has retained its original 19th-century commercial core as a nationally recognized Old Town Historic District. Eureka is home to California's oldest zoo, the Sequoia Park Zoo.

History 
Eureka's Pacific coastal location on Humboldt Bay, adjacent to abundant redwood forests, provided the reason for settlement of this 19th-century seaport town. Before the arrival of Euro-American settlers, including farmers, miners, fishermen, and loggers, the area was home to Native Americans.

Native Americans 
The Wiyot people lived in Jaroujiji (Wiyot: "where you sit and rest"), now known as Eureka, for thousands of years before European arrival. Their traditional coastal homeland ranged from the lower Mad River through Humboldt Bay and south along the lower basin of the Eel River. The Wiyot are particularly known for their basketry and fishery management. An extensive collection of intricate basketry of the area's indigenous groups exists in the Clarke Historical Museum in Old Town Eureka.

, Eureka High School has the largest Yurok language program in California.

The Wiyot and Yurok are the westernmost peoples to speak Algic languages.

Founding on Humboldt Bay

For nearly 300 years after 1579, European exploration of the coast of what would become northern California repeatedly missed definitively locating Humboldt Bay because of a combination of geographic features and weather conditions which concealed the narrow bay entrance from view. Despite a well-documented 1806 sighting by Russian explorers, the bay was not definitively known by Europeans until an 1849 overland exploration provided a reliable accounting of the exact location of what is the second-largest bay in California. The timing of this discovery led to the May 13, 1850, founding of the settlement of Eureka on its shore by the Union and Mendocino Exploring (development) companies.

Gold Rush era

After the primary California Gold Rush in the Sierras, Humboldt Bay was settled with the intent of providing a convenient alternative to the long overland route from Sacramento to supply miners on the Trinity, Klamath and Salmon Rivers where gold had been discovered. Though the ideal location on Humboldt Bay adjacent to naturally deeper shipping channels ultimately guaranteed Eureka's development as the primary city on the bay, Arcata's proximity to developing supply lines to inland gold mines ensured supremacy over Eureka through 1856.

"Eureka" received its name from a Greek word meaning "I have found it!" This exuberant statement of successful (or hopeful) gold rush miners is also the official motto of the State of California. Eureka is the only U.S. location to use the same seal as the state for its seal.

Wiyot Massacre
The first Europeans venturing into Humboldt Bay encountered the indigenous Wiyot. After 1850, Americans ultimately overwhelmed the Wiyot, whose maximum population before the Europeans' arrival numbered in the hundreds in the area of what would become the county's primary city. But in almost every case, settlers ultimately cut off access to ancestral sources of food in addition to the outright theft of land, despite the efforts of some U.S. government and military officials to assist the native peoples or at least maintain peace. Fort Humboldt was established by the U.S. Army on January 30, 1853, as a buffer between Native Americans, gold-seekers and settlers, commanded by Brevet Lieutenant Colonel Robert C. Buchanan of the U.S. 4th Infantry Regiment. The 1860 Wiyot Massacre took place on Indian Island in the spring of 1860, committed by a group of locals thought to be composed primarily of Eureka businessmen. (The male Wiyot tribal members had left the island during their annual New Year ritual and the vigilantes killed as many as 250 children, women, and elderly tribal members) Major Gabriel J. Rains, Commanding Officer of Fort Humboldt at the time, reported to his commanding officer that a local group of vigilantes had resolved to "kill every peaceable Indian – man, woman, and child."

Lumber industry
Eureka's first post office opened in 1853 just as the town began to carve its grid plan into the edge of a forest it would ultimately consume to feed the building of San Francisco and points beyond. Many of the first immigrants who arrived as prospectors were also lumbermen, and the vast potential for industry on the bay was soon realized, especially as many hopeful gold miners realized the difficulty and infrequency of striking it rich in the mines. By 1854, after only four years since the founding, seven of nine mills processing timber into marketable lumber on Humboldt Bay were within Eureka. A year later, 140 lumber schooners operated in and out of Humboldt Bay moving lumber from the mills to booming cities along the Pacific coast. By the time the charter for Eureka was granted in 1856, busy mills inside the city had a daily production capacity of 220,000 board feet. This level of production, which would grow significantly and continue for more than a century, secured Eureka as the "timber capital" of California. Eureka was at the apex of rapid growth of the lumber industry because of its location between huge coast redwood forests and its control of the primary port facilities. Loggers brought the enormous redwood trees down. Dozens of movable narrow gauge railroads brought trainloads of logs and finished lumber products to the main rail line, which led directly to Eureka's wharf and waiting schooners. By the 1880s, railroads eventually brought the production of hundreds of mills throughout the region to Eureka, primarily for shipment through its port. After the early 1900s, shipment of products occurred by trucks, trains, and ships from Eureka, Humboldt Bay, and other points in the region, but Eureka remained the busy center of all this activity for over 120 years. These factors and others made Eureka a significant city in early California state history.

Commercial center
A bustling commercial district with ornate Victorian-style buildings rose in proximity to the waterfront, reflecting the great prosperity experienced during this era. Hundreds of these Victorian homes remain today, of which many are totally restored and a few have always remained in their original elegance and splendor. The representation of these homes in Eureka, grouped with those in nearby Arcata and the Victorian village of Ferndale, are of considerable importance to the overall development of Victorian architecture built in the nation. The magnificent Carson Mansion on 2nd and M Streets, is perhaps the most spectacular Victorian in the nation. The home was built between 1884 and 1886 by renowned 19th-century architects Newsom and Newsom for lumber baron William M. Carson. This project was designed to keep mill workers and expert craftsman busy during a slow period in the industry. Old Town Eureka, the original downtown center of this busy city in the 19th century, has been restored and has become a lively arts center. The Old Town area has been declared an Historic District by the National Register of Historic Places. The district is made up of over 150 buildings, which in total represents much of Eureka's original 19th-century core commercial center. This nexus of culture behind the redwood curtain still contains much of its Victorian architecture, which, if not maintained for original use as commercial buildings or homes, have been transformed into scores of unique lodgings, restaurants, and small shops featuring a burgeoning cottage industry of hand-made creations, from glassware to wood-burning stoves, and a large variety of locally created art.

Fishing, shipping, and boating
Eureka's founding and livelihood was and remains linked to Humboldt Bay, the Pacific Ocean, and related industries, especially fishing. In 1858 the first of many ships built in Eureka was launched, beginning an industry that spanned scores of years. The bay is also the site of the West Coast's largest oyster farming operations, which began its commercial status in the nineteenth century. Eureka is the home port to more than 100 fishing vessels (with an all-time high of over 400 in 1981) in two modern marinas which can berth approximately 400 boats within the city limits and at least 50 more in nearby Fields Landing, which is part of Greater Eureka.

Chinese expulsion

Racist views of Chinese immigrants in the late 19th century led to violent attacks on them by White settlers across the West, both before and after the Chinese Exclusion Act. Economic downturns resulting in competition for jobs fed sinophobia and violent actions against Chinese immigrants, especially on the Pacific coast. In February 1885, Eureka City Councilman David Kendall was caught in the crossfire of two rival Chinese gangs and killed. A group of 600 White vigilantes forcibly and permanently evicted all 480 Chinese residents of Eureka's Chinatown.

Among those who guarded the city jail during the height of the sinophobic tension was James Gillett, who went on to become Governor of California. The anti-Chinese ordinance was repealed in 1959.

Queen City of the Ultimate West 

Completion of the Northwestern Pacific Railroad in 1914 provided the local lumber industry with an alternative to ships for transport of its millions of board feet of lumber to reach markets in San Francisco and beyond. It also provided the first safe land route between San Francisco and Eureka for people to venture to the Redwood Empire. As a result, Eureka's population of 7,300 swelled to 15,000 within ten years. By 1922, the Redwood Highway was completed, providing for the first reliable, direct overland route for automobiles from San Francisco. Eureka's transportation connection to the "outside" world had changed dramatically after more than half a century of stage rides or treacherous steamship passage through the Humboldt Bar and on the Pacific Ocean to San Francisco. The building of the Eureka Inn coincided with the opening of the new road to San Francisco. As a result of immense civic pride during this early-20th-century era of expansion, Eureka officially nicknamed itself "Queen City of the Ultimate West." The tourism industry, lodging to support it, and related marketing had been born.

Post–World War II
The timber economy of Eureka is part of the Pacific Northwest timber economy which rises and falls with boom-and-bust economic times. In Eureka, both the timber industry and commercial fishing declined after the Second World War.

The Columbus Day Storm of 1962 downed trees and caused a surplus in the domestic timber market, which caused increased shipping to foreign markets. The log trade with Japan and other Pacific Rim nations increased. Despite many rumors to the contrary, little of this wood returned to U.S. markets. In 1989, the U.S. changed log export laws, permitting lower-cost timber from public lands to be exported as raw logs overseas to help balance the federal budget.

After 1990, the global log market declined, and exports fell at the same time as Pacific Northwest log prices increased; leading buyers to seek less expensive logs from Canada and the southern United States. However, debate continues among four stakeholders: timber owners, domestic processors, consumers and communities, on the impact of log export on the local economy. During the span 1991 to 2001, timber harvest peaked in 1997. The local timber market was also affected by the Pacific Lumber Company hostile takeover and ultimate bankruptcy.

Local fisheries expanded through the 1970s and early 1980s. During the 1970s, Eureka fishermen landed more than half of the fish and shellfish produced and consumed in California. In 2010 between 100 and 120 commercial fishing vessels listed Eureka as homeport. The highest landings of all species were 36.9 million pounds (16.7 million kg) in 1981 while the lowest were in 2001 with 9.4 million pounds (4.3 million kg).

After 1990 regulatory, economic, and other events led to a contraction of the local commercial fleet. In 1991, the Woodley Island marina opened, providing docking facilities for much of Eureka's commercial and recreational fleet. Many species are considered to be overfished. Recreational fishing has increased over time. Fifty percent of recreational fishermen using local boats are tourists from outside the area.

In 2004, only  were harvested. Oysters and oyster seed continue to be exported from Humboldt Bay. The value of the oysters and spawn is more than $6 million per year. Consolidation of buyers and landing facilities resulted in local vulnerability to unexpected events, leading the city to obtain grant funding for and complete the Fishermen's Terminal on the waterfront which will provide fish handling, marketing, and public spaces.

Significant earthquakes

The area regularly experiences large earthquakes as it is situated on the southern end the Cascadia subduction zone and near the San Andreas Fault, which interface around the Mendocino Triple Junction. After two seconds, it became a violent "jumper", making objects fly; the mostly vertical shocks from the ground led to broken windows in shops, overturned shelving in homes and stores, and damage to architectural detail on a number of historic buildings. Local hospitals treated mostly minor related injuries, and electrical power was out over a large area. Numerous natural gas leaks occurred, but no fires resulted. This was the largest recent earthquake since the April 25–26, 1992 sequence. The shaking was felt within a  radius, as far north as southern Oregon and as far south as Sonoma County. The largest recorded in the area was the 7.2  event on November 8, 1980. The larger earthquakes can pose a tsunami threat to coastal areas.

Geography 

Eureka is situated within California's Redwood Empire region which includes Pacific Ocean coast, Humboldt Bay, and several rivers in addition to Redwood National and State Parks and Humboldt Redwoods State Park.

The city marina is on one of three islands at a narrow point on the  bay and increases in elevation slightly as it spreads north, south, and especially to the east. The city gently encroaches at least two miles eastward into primarily Redwood and Douglas-fir second growth forests. The city has a traditional grid that generally radiates toward the points of the compass. Most post-1970 houses were built in formerly clear cut forested areas.

The transition between the official city limits and smaller unincorporated areas is mostly not discernible. Eastern areas including secluded developments on a golf course among or in close proximity to extensive second-growth forest have more recently developed. These new houses were built as a result of the Eureka Community Plan of 1995 in attempt to bring locals close to centers of recreation and encourage community interaction. The city then gives way to hills and mountains of the rugged coast range, which quickly exceed  in elevation.

Eureka is more or less on the same latitude as Atlantic cities New York City and Porto in Portugal along with the Mediterranean city of Naples in Italy, all of whom have much warmer summers in spite of also being on coastlines.

Climate 
Eureka enjoys a mild, temperate cool-summer mediterranean climate (Köppen climate classification: Csb). Due to the influence of the Pacific Ocean and being on the shoreline of the cold-water Humboldt Bay, its temperatures are cooler than those of a typical mediterranean climate. Winters are mild and rainy, and summers mild, cool, and dry. Eureka's average summer temperatures are much cooler than New York City and Istanbul which lie on the same latitude (and its average winter temperatures are also milder than those two cities); and are similar to those of Southeast Alaska, Scotland or Tierra del Fuego in southern Argentina and Chile, which lie well above the 50th parallel.

Eureka is unique among mid-latitude climates in the northern hemisphere in that in more than 135 years of recorded temperatures, February has measured a warmer absolute maximum temperature than both the two high summer months of July and August. The absolute maximum temperature of July is merely  in spite of the high sun strength.

On average, the highest temperature seen throughout the entire year is only , one of the mildest in the contiguous US, while on average the lowest temperature seen in the year (most often occurring at night) is only a similarly moderate , yielding a very short and mild temperature range of about  throughout the year.

Eureka has never recorded an ice day, with the coldest daytime maximum being  in 1990. NOAA’s weather station averages indicate only  of rainfall in July, which is well within the mediterranean range, only with rainier winters, cooler and milder air than a typical mediterranean climate. Winter temperatures instead are similar to many climates found in Southern Europe from which basin the climate type is named.

The area experiences coastal fog throughout the year, especially during summer on the coast when temperatures in the city remain consistently around a mild . This phenomenon, together with cool breezes from the Pacific Ocean, keeps Eureka relatively cool and mild, while contrasting with inland areas in relative proximity to Humboldt Bay, which are prone to extreme temperatures that often exceed . Despite the common coastal fog, Eureka enjoys on average about 55% possible sunshine per year, about on par with cities such as Calgary, Portland, New York City and Chicago.

Annual precipitation averages . Measurable precipitation falls on an average of 127.5 days each year, concentrated heavily from October to April. However, historic 100-year dramatic weather events such as the Christmas Week flood of 1955 and, especially, the Christmas flood of 1964, which severely damaged the region, may not be reflected in records listed herein. Snowfall on the coast happens only on rare occasions, averaging  as of the 1981–2010 normals, but only five years during that period received measurable snowfall.

Demographics 

The population of the city was 27,191 at the 2010 census, up from 26,128 at the 2000 census, representing a 4.1% increase, and the population of Greater Eureka was 45,034 at the 2010 Census, up from 43,452 at the 2000 census, representing a 3.6% increase.

According to a report by the City of Eureka, the Greater Eureka area minimally includes the unincorporated adjacent or nearby neighborhoods and Census Defined Populated Areas of Bayview, Cutten, Elk River, Freshwater, Humboldt Hill, Indianola, Myrtletown, Pine Hill, Ridgewood Heights, and Rosewood, all of which have Eureka addresses, postal zip codes and Eureka-specific telephone numbers. The Greater Eureka area makes up the largest urban settlement on the Pacific Coast between San Francisco and Portland. This area is similar to what the U.S. Census officially defines as the Eureka UC (urban cluster), which is a "densely settled core of census tracts and/or census blocks that meet minimum population density requirements, along with adjacent territory containing non-residential urban land uses as well as territory with low population density included to link outlying densely settled territory with the densely settled core" of up to 50,000 in population. The bayside communities of Manila, Samoa, and Fairhaven (all on the Samoa Peninsula), and King Salmon and Fields Landing (both located south of the city), and communities listed above, with the exception of Elk River and Freshwater, are shown to be part of the Eureka Urban Cluster. Eureka is the largest city of the Eureka-Arcata-Fortuna Micropolitan Area, a construct of the U.S. Census Bureau, which is synonymous with the County of Humboldt.

2000 Census data
As of the census of 2000, there were 26,128 people. The racial makeup of the city was 88.5% White, 1.2% Black or African American, 4.2% Native American, 2.6% Asian, 0.3% Pacific Islander, 2.7% from other races, and 5.10% from two or more races. Hispanic or Latino people of any race were 10.8% of the population.

There were 10,957 households, out of which 25.8% had children under the age of 18 living with them, 34.8% were married couples living together, 14.0% had a female householder with no husband present, and 46.3% were non-families. 35.3% of all households were made up of individuals, and 11.8% had someone living alone who was 65 years of age or older. The average household size was 2.26 and the average family size was 2.93. In the city, the population dispersal was 22.4% under the age of 18, 11.6% from 18 to 24, 28.9% from 25 to 44, 23.5% from 45 to 64, and 13.7% who were 65 years of age or older. The median age was 37 years. For every 100 females, there were 98.1 males. For every 100 females age 18 and over, there were 95.7 males.

The median income for a household in the city was $25,849, and the median income for a family was $33,438. Males had a median income of $28,706 versus $22,038 for females. The per capita income for the city was $16,174. About 15.8% of families and 23.7% of the population were below the poverty line, including 29.6% of those under the age of 18 and 11.1% of those 65 and older.

2010 Census data
The 2010 United States Census reported that Eureka had a population of 27,191. The racial makeup of Eureka was 21,565 (79.3%) White, 514 (1.9%) African American, 1,011 (3.7%) Native American, 1,153 (4.2%) Asian, 176 (0.6%) Pacific Islander, 1,181 (4.3%) from other races, and 1,591 (5.9%) from two or more races. Hispanic or Latino people of any race were 3,143 persons (11.6%).

The census reported that 25,308 people (93.1% of the population) lived in households, 1,434 (5.3%) lived in non-institutionalized group quarters, and 449 (1.7%) were institutionalized.

There were 11,150 households, out of which 2,891 (25.9%) had children under the age of 18 living in them, 3,554 (31.9%) were opposite-sex married couples living together, 1,449 (13.0%) had a female householder with no husband present, 710 (6.4%) had a male householder with no wife present. There were 1,161 (10.4%) unmarried opposite-sex partnerships, and 146 (1.3%) same-sex married couples or partnerships. 3,971 households (35.6%) were made up of individuals, and 1,183 (10.6%) had someone living alone who was 65 years of age or older. The average household size was 2.27. There were 5,713 families (51.2% of all households); the average family size was 2.93.

The population dispersal was 5,431 people (20.0%) under the age of 18, 3,102 people (11.4%) aged 18 to 24, 8,021 people (29.5%) aged 25 to 44, 7,422 people (27.3%) aged 45 to 64, and 3,215 people (11.8%) who were 65 years of age or older. The median age was 36.2 years. For every 100 females, there were 106.0 males. For every 100 females age 18 and over, there were 105.7 males. The homeowner vacancy rate was 2.0%; the rental vacancy rate was 3.7%. 11,251 people (41.4% of the population) lived in owner-occupied housing units and 14,057 people (51.7%) lived in rental housing units.

Economy

The economic base of the city was founded on timber and fishing and supplying gold mining efforts inland. Gold mining diminished quickly in the early years, and activities of timber and fishing have also diminished, especially in the latter decades of the twentieth century. Today, the major industries are tourism, timber (in value), and healthcare and services (in number of jobs). Major employers today in Eureka include the following governmental entities: College of the Redwoods, The County of Humboldt, and the Humboldt County Office of Education. St. Joseph Hospital is the largest private employer in Eureka.

Government

Local government
The City of Eureka has a mayor-council system of governance. Primary power lies with the five council members, divided into five wards. The mayor has the power to appoint, as well as ceremonial duties, though the job includes presiding over council meetings and meeting visiting dignitaries. Official city business is administered by the Office of the City Manager. The Eureka City Council regularly meets on the 1st and 3rd Tuesdays of the month at 5:30 pm for closed session, and 6:30 pm for open session. Open sessions are open to the public.

State and federal government

Infrastructure

Transportation

Land
 U.S. Route 101 is the major north and south highway, which connects Eureka to the rest of the North Coast region. The highway follows city streets through the city, with flow and cross-traffic controlled by traffic signals. Highway 101 enters Eureka from the south as Broadway. As it reaches the downtown area, it splits into a one-way couplet composed of 4th Street and 5th Street. On the north side of the city, northbound and southbound rejoin at the northeast side before the highway becomes a restricted (safety corridor) expressway (to Arcata and points beyond) as double bridges cross the Eureka Slough (mouth of the Freshwater Creek).

 State Route 255 is an alternate route of U.S. 101 between Eureka and the nearby city of Arcata, running along the western shore of Humboldt Bay. It begins in the downtown area at U.S. 101 and proceeds north along R Street towards the Samoa Bridge and the community of Samoa.

 State Route 299 (formerly U.S. Route 299) connects to U.S. Route 101 at the northern end of Arcata. Route 299 begins at that point and extends easterly to serve as the major traffic artery to the east for Eureka.

Air
This airport has one airline, United Airlines, and connects to San Francisco and Los Angeles. Murray Field and Eureka Municipal Airport are general aviation airports for private and charter air service. Both are located adjacent to Humboldt Bay.

Water
The Humboldt Bay Harbor Recreation & Conservation District manages the resources of Humboldt Bay and its environs, including the deep-water port. The port is located directly west of the city and is serviced across the bay in the community of Samoa. In addition to two deep-water channel docks for large ships, several modern small-craft marinas are available for private use, with a total capacity of more than 400 boats.

Bus service
Public bus transportation services within Eureka are provided by the Eureka Transit Service. The Redwood Transit System provides bus transportation through Eureka and connects to major towns and places outside the city, including educational institutions. Dial-A-Ride service is available through an application process.

Amtrak provides Thruway Bus service to Eureka at its unstaffed bus stop. The bus service connects passengers from the northernmost coastal train station in Martinez, California, and continues to southern Oregon.

Greyhound provides bus service to San Francisco from Eureka. Tickets may be purchased online or at the nearest full-service station in Arcata.

Transit in Eureka is expected to be improved by the $30 million Eureka Regional Transit and Housing Center, or EaRTH Center, which was greenlighted by the Eureka City Council in mid-February 2022. The development will contain an intermodal transit center, including car share facilities and regional bus connections, in addition to 31 affordable apartments. It is slated for completion in the fall of 2024.

Utilities

Electricity and natural gas
Eureka residents are served by Pacific Gas and Electric Company. Some reserves of natural gas are located south of the city. These and other fuels help power the Humboldt Bay Power Plant (which includes the defunct Humboldt Bay Nuclear Power Plant). In 2010, the cogeneration plant increased its capacity from 130 MW to 163 MW.

Water
The City of Eureka is the largest of the local water districts supplied by the Humboldt Bay Municipal Water District. The entire region is one of the few places in California that has historically enjoyed a significant surplus of water. The reduction in major forest products manufacturing in recent decades has left the area with a 45 MGD surplus of industrial water.

Healthcare
Eureka is the regional center for healthcare. The city is served by St. Joseph Hospital, which is the largest medical acute care hospital north of the San Francisco Bay Area on the California Coast. The hospital was first opened in 1920 and was operated by the Sisters of Saint Joseph of Orange until 2016. The facility is composed of two parts: a main campus contains the acute care facility and a nearby second site, the former General Hospital Campus, which contains a rehabilitation facility and a skilled nursing site.

In November 2012, the hospital completed required earthquake safety standards upgrades. The new primary wing contains surgical suites, intensive care, 24-hour emergency care, as well as new and enlarged patient rooms for those requiring care beyond short stay or outpatient procedures, assisted living facilities, skilled nursing facilities, surgery centers, and radiology (including MRI) facilities.

In June 2016, the California Attorney General's office approved merging the St. Joseph Health system and the Providence Health and Services which includes St. Joseph's in Eureka, making it part of the third-largest non-profit health system in the nation. The merger raises local and regional concerns about health care.

Eureka is also the site of the only comprehensive private and county-operated mental health emergency and hospitalization facilities north of San Francisco within California. Most of the doctors for the many medical specialties available on the far North Coast are located in or near Eureka, which also has the only oncology program and dialysis clinic in the region.

Education
Institutions of higher learning include the College of the Redwoods and California State Polytechnic University, Humboldt in Arcata. College of the Redwoods manages a downtown satellite campus as well.

Eureka City Schools, the largest school district in the region, administers the public schools of the city. Eureka High School receives all students from city grammar schools as well as all those from nearby unincorporated communities. Specific schools include: Alice Birney Elementary, Grant Elementary, Lafayette Elementary, Washington Elementary, Winship Middle School, Zane Middle School, Eureka High School, Humboldt Bay High School, Zoe Barnum High School, the Eureka Adult School, and Winzler Children's Center. The district offices are located in the remodeled Marshall School, which also contains the Marshall Family Resource Center, a site designed to offer programs in support of parents and families.

Shopping 
The North Coast's primary shopping facility, the Bayshore Mall, is the largest north of the San Francisco Bay Area on the California coast. The mall features over 70 stores, which is anchored by Kohl's and Walmart. TJ Maxx and Ulta opened in 2013. Other major shopping areas and centers include Henderson Center, the Eureka Mall, Burre Center, and Downtown and Old Town Eureka.

Arts and culture

Eureka is one of California's historic landmarks. The California State Historical marker, #477, designating Eureka, is located in Old Town, one of the nation's best-preserved original Victorian-era commercial districts. The city was voted as the No. 1 best small art town in John Villani's book The 100 Best Small Art Towns in America. Eureka hosts the region's largest monthly cultural and arts event, "Arts' Alive!" on the first Saturday of each month. More than 80 Eureka business and local galleries open their doors to the public. Often local cuisine and beverages accompany live performances by acclaimed regional bands and other types of performance art. The downtown Eureka area is also decorated with many murals.

Theater offerings include year-round productions from several various theater groups, including the North Coast Repertory Theater, the Redwood Curtain Theatre, and the Eureka Theater. Various events occur throughout the year at the Redwood Acres Fairgrounds. Museums include the Clarke Historical Museum, the Humboldt Bay Maritime Museum, the Morris Graves Museum of Art, HSU First Street Gallery, Discovery Museum for Children, the Fort Humboldt State Historic Park and the Blue Ox Millworks and Historic Park.

Annual cultural events 

Redwood Coast Music Festival – May
Perilous Plunge – March
Rhododendron Festival – April
Kinetic sculpture race – May
Redwood Acres Fair and Rodeo – June
Humboldt Wood Fair – June
Summer Concert Series on the Boardwalk – June – August
Fourth of July Celebration – July
Humboldt Bay Full of Blues – August 30 & 31, 2014
Chicken Wingfest – September
Excalibur Medieval Tournament and Market Faire – September
Pride Parade and Celebration – September
Humboldt Bay Paddle Fest – September
Craftsman's Days – November
Christmas Truckers Parade – December

Museums and galleries 

Museums include the Clarke Historical Museum, the Humboldt Bay Maritime Museum, the Morris Graves Museum of Art, HSU First Street Gallery, Kinetic Museum, Discovery Museum for Children, the Fort Humboldt State Historic Park and the Blue Ox Millworks and Historic Park.

Architecture 

Because of northern isolation and unfavorable economic conditions in the latter part of the twentieth century, much of the post-war redevelopment and urban renewal that other cities experienced did not occur in Eureka. As a result, Eureka has hundreds of examples of 19th- and early-20th-century architecture and historic districts.

The original Queen Anne-style Murphy home in San Francisco was completely destroyed by the fire resulting from the 1906 San Francisco earthquake. Mark Carter found the blueprints for the home in an antique store and rebuilt the structure, but in Eureka; it is now the Carter House Inn.

Approximately 16% of the city's structures are cataloged as important historical structures, with many of those attaining the status of state and national significance in terms of a particular structure's importance in relationship to the body of surviving examples of the architectural style attributed to its construction and related detail. Thirteen distinct districts have been identified which meet the criteria for the National Register of Historic Places. Among them are the 2nd Street District (10 buildings), 15th Street district (13 buildings) and the O Street district (43 buildings). Hillsdale Street, a popular and well-preserved district, contains 17 buildings of historic interest. In all, some 1,500 buildings have been recognized as qualifying for the National Register. The Eureka Heritage Society, a local architectural preservation group founded in 1973, has been instrumental in protecting and preserving many of Eureka's fine Victorians.

Parks and recreation
Other parks in or near Eureka include the Humboldt Botanical Garden and the Humboldt Bay National Wildlife Refuge, and the Eureka Marsh, an accessible protected marsh between the Bayshore Mall and Humboldt Bay. There is a modern boardwalk along the city's waterfront. Halvorsen Park includes a walkway along the water.

Media
Though Eureka has been the base for two major daily newspapers at different times in its 150 years, only the Times-Standard, owned by the Colorado-based Media News Group, survives. Media News Group also owns a weekly classified advertiser, the Tri-City Weekly. The Eureka Reporter, founded in 2003, became a daily in 2006, began publishing five days per week at the end of 2007, and permanently closed in November 2008. The Times-Standard printed nearly 20,000 papers per day as of 2004; as of 2018, its distribution was 13,000 and it published online-only on Mondays. The LostCoast Outpost is another web based news source

The North Coast Journal, a regional weekly, moved from Arcata to Eureka in 2009. Eureka is also home to several alternative weekly publications. Senior News is a 24-page monthly newspaper distributed along a  stretch of the Northwest California coast, published by the Humboldt Senior Resource Center since 1981. The small staff is augmented by community volunteer writers and by senior volunteers who distribute 5,000 free newspapers to more than 100 locations from Crescent City to Garberville.

Many of Humboldt County's commercial radio stations are based in Eureka: KINS-FM (106.3), KWSW (980 AM), and KEKA-FM (101.5), owned and operated by Eureka Broadcasting Co. Inc. KFMI, KRED, KJNY and KATA. Lost Coast Communications owns and operates several stations broadcasting to Eureka: KSLG-FM, KHUM, KLGE, and KWPT. Eureka also hosts KMUE, the local repeater for Redway-based community radio station KMUD. On August 26, 2006, the Blue Ox Millworks launched KKDS-LP, a low power FM station focused on youth and community issues. On November 3, 2008, a low-power part 15 AM radio station, Old Glory Radio 1650 AM, based in the Myrtletown neighborhood of Eureka, went on the air; it offers the area's only daily live local call-in program in the morning. KHSU, the region's local public radio station, is broadcast from Cal Poly Humboldt in Arcata. A traveler's information station owned by the State of California, KMKE-LP, operates at 98.1 MHz.

Eureka's first television station was KIEM, which signed on the air on October 25, 1953. Additional stations signed on in the years following that first telecast, beginning in 1958, including KVIQ-LD and KAEF-TV.

Notable people

See also 

 Clarke Historical Museum
 HSU First Street Gallery
 Humboldt Arts Council
 Humboldt Bay Maritime Museum
 Humboldt Botanical Gardens
 Humboldt County Historical Society
 List of cities and towns in California
 Sequoia Park Zoo

Notes

References

Further reading

External links

 
 Eureka Art and Culture Commission
 Greater Eureka Chamber of Commerce
 Eureka Heritage Society
 

 
1850 establishments in California
1856 establishments in California
California Historical Landmarks
Cities in Humboldt County, California
County seats in California
History of Humboldt County, California
Incorporated cities and towns in California
Logging communities in the United States
Populated coastal places in California
Populated places established in 1850
Port cities in California